Remains or The Remains may refer to:

Music
The Remains (band), a 1960s American rock band
The Ramainz, originally The Remains, a Ramones tribute band

Albums 
Remains (Alkaline Trio album), 2007
Remains (Annihilator album), 1997
Remains (The Only Ones album), 1984
Remains (Steve Lacy album) or the title song, 1992
The Remains (album), by the Remains, 1966
Remains, by Bella Morte, 1997

Songs 
"Remains" (song), by Maurissa Tancharoen and Jed Whedon, 2009
"Remains", by Charlotte Church from Three, 2013
"Remains", by Zola Jesus from Okovi, 2017

Other uses
Remains (comics), a 2004 comic book series by Steve Niles and Kieron Dwyer
Remains (film), a 2011 American horror film based on the comic book series
The Remains (film), a 2016 American horror film

See also
Human remains (disambiguation)
The Remains of the Day (disambiguation)